Columb McKinley (24 August 1950 – 6 February 2021) was a Scottish footballer who played as a half back for Airdrie and Dumbarton.

McKinley began his career with Vale of Leven juniors before moving to Airdrieonians in 1969, after six years with the Broomfield club he then moved to Dumbarton in 1975 where he played a key part in the club's run to the 1976 Scottish Cup semi final against Heart of Midlothian, he quit the senior game in 1978 to return to Vale Of Leven Juniors.

McKinley died on 6 February 2021, aged 70.

References

1950 births
2021 deaths
Scottish footballers
Association football wing halves
Dumbarton F.C. players
Airdrieonians F.C. (1878) players
Scottish Football League players
Place of birth missing
Place of death missing
Vale of Leven F.C. players
Hong Kong First Division League players
Hong Kong Rangers FC players
Seiko SA players
Hong Kong League XI representative players